The Canvas Kisser is a 1925 American silent sports drama film directed by Duke Worne and starring Ashton Dearholt, Ruth Dwyer and Edward Cecil.

Synopsis
A boxer makes his living by betting on opponents and then deliberately losing to them. However under the influence of a woman he sets out to reform.

Cast
 Ashton Dearholt as Jimmy O'Neil 
 Ruth Dwyer as Ruth Harkness
 Garry O'Dell as 	Crock Wiggins - Jimmy's Manager
 Edward Cecil as Harkness - Ruth's Father

References

Bibliography
 Munden, Kenneth White. The American Film Institute Catalog of Motion Pictures Produced in the United States, Part 1. University of California Press, 1997.

External links
 

1925 films
1925 drama films
1920s English-language films
American silent feature films
American boxing films
Silent American drama films
Films directed by Duke Worne
1920s sports drama films
1920s American films
American sports drama films
Silent sports drama films